Aggie Field Hockey Facility is a  field hockey stadium on the campus of University of California, Davis in Davis, California.

The stadium was constructed in 2014 for the UC Davis field hockey team, which previously played at Aggie Stadium on the UC Davis campus.

References

External links
 UC Davis athletic facilities

University of California, Davis campus
UC Davis Aggies
Sports venues in Yolo County, California
College field hockey venues in the United States
2014 establishments in California
Sports venues completed in 2014